Dominica competed at the 2018 Commonwealth Games in the Gold Coast, Australia from April 4 to April 15, 2018. It was Dominica's 10th appearance at the Commonwealth Games. Dominica won their first two Commonwealth Games medals at these games

The Dominican team consisted of 13 athletes (ten men and three women) that competed in three sports.

Medalists

Competitors
The following is the list of number of competitors participating at the Games per sport/discipline.

Athletics (track and field)

Dominica entered ten athletes (eight men and two women).

Men
Track & road events

Field events

Women
Field events

Boxing

Dominica participated with a team of 2 athletes (1 man and 1 woman).

Cycling

Dominica participated with 1 athlete (1 man).

Road
Men

See also
Dominica at the 2018 Summer Youth Olympics

References

Nations at the 2018 Commonwealth Games
Dominica at the Commonwealth Games
2018 in Dominica sport